One Pangasinan Alliance or OPAL (DMA) is an economic alliance of six towns and one city of western Pangasinan, representing the 1st District of Pangasinan. It is composed of Alaminos, Agno, Anda, Bani, Bolinao, Burgos, Dasol, Infanta, Mabini & Sual

According to the 2007 Philippine census, OPAL is home to 379,637 people and a land area of 1,759.

Geography

Components

Physical
OPAL is bounded by the 2nd District of Pangasinan to the South East, Lingayen Gulf to the North and North East, South China Sea facing West and Zambales on the South.

Economy

OPAL's economic drivers are Aquaculture, Tourism, Farming and Mineral extraction.

Energy
The 1200 megawatt Sual Coal-Fired Power Plant is located in the town of Sual.

Marine
Fish pens and fishponds dot the coastline of OPAL.

Agriculture
The major crops in are rice, mangoes, and corn.

Tourist attractions
Cape Bolinao Beach in Bolinao 
Tambobong White Beach in Dasol
Caves of Dasol
Tondol Beach in Anda
Cacupangan Cave System (Bintanilya, Binmatya, Villacorta Caves) in Brgys Tagudin & Villacorta, Mabini
Sto. Rosario Cave System (Tubo-Tubo, Bual, Cabalyoriza Caves) in Brgys San Pedro & Barlo, Mabini
Caves in Brgy. De Guzman, Mabini
Balincaguin River in Mabini
Sawang Falls in Brgy. Villcorta, Mabini
Nalsoc Cave System (Mel-let, Abot Aso Caves) in Brgy. Colayo, Bani
Bolinao Museum in Bolinao
Hundred Islands Marine Sanctuary in Alaminos
Oceanographic Marine Laboratory in Alaminos
Hundred Islands National Park of Alaminos
Umbrella Rocks of Agno
Viewdeck in Suasalito, Sual, Pangasinan
Dumaloy Cave & Sinkhole in Bolinao

Investment

See also

Urdaneta
San Carlos
Dagupan

References

http://www.alaminoscity.gov.ph/news/newsdetails.aspx?newsid=518
http://www.hundredislands.ph/news/ndetail.asp?ID=465
http://sundaypunch.prepys.com/archives/2009/06/08/opal-tapping-river-for-potable-water/

External links
Official Website of National Economic and Development Authority
Official Website of LGU-Mabini
Balincaguin Conservancy Grotto

Politics of Pangasinan